Frank Isaac Robinson (born December 28, 1938), known in his early musical career as Sugar Chile Robinson, is an American jazz pianist and singer. A Detroit native, Robinson became famous as a child prodigy in the mid-1940s.

Biography
Robinson was born the youngest of seven children to Clarence A. and Elizabeth Robinson in Detroit, Michigan. At an early age he showed unusual gifts singing the blues and accompanying himself on the piano. According to contemporary newsreels, he was self-taught and managed to use techniques including slapping the keys with elbows and fists.

Robinson won a talent show at the Paradise Theatre in Detroit at the age of three, and in 1945 played guest spots at the theatre with Lionel Hampton, who was prevented by child protection legislation from taking Robinson on tour with him. However, Robinson performed on radio with Hampton and Harry "The Hipster" Gibson, and also appeared as himself in the Hollywood film No Leave, No Love, starring Van Johnson and Keenan Wynn.

In 1946, Robinson played for President Harry S. Truman at the White House Correspondents' Association Dinner, shouting out "How'm I Doin', Mr. President?" – which became his catchphrase – during his performance of "Caldonia". He was the first African American performer to appear at the annual WHCA dinner. He began touring major theaters, setting box office records in Detroit and California. In 1949, he was given special permission to join the American Federation of Musicians and record his first releases on Capitol Records, "Numbers Boogie" and "Caldonia", both reaching the Billboard R&B chart. In 1950, he toured and appeared on television with Count Basie and in a short film 'Sugar Chile' Robinson, Billie Holiday, Count Basie and His Sextet. The following year, he toured the United Kingdom, appearing at the London Palladium. He stopped recording in 1952, later explaining: I wanted to go to school... I wanted some school background in me and I asked my Dad if I could stop, and I went to school because I honestly wanted my college diploma.

Until 1956, Robinson continued to make occasional appearances as a jazz musician, billed as Frank Robinson, and performed on one occasion with Gerry Mulligan, but then gave up his musical career entirely. Continuing his academic studies, he earned a degree in history from Olivet College and one in psychology from the Detroit Institute of Technology. In the 1960s, he worked for WGPR-TV, and also helped set up small record labels in Detroit and opened a recording studio.

Later years
In more recent years, Robinson has made occasional appearances as a musician with the help of the American Music Research Foundation. In 2002, Robinson appeared at a special concert celebrating Detroit music, and in 2007 he traveled to Britain to appear at a rock and roll weekend festival. In the last Dr Boogie show of 2013, Robinson was the featured artist, with four of his classic hits showcased amid biographical sketches of his early career. On April 30, 2016, Robinson attended the White House Correspondents' Dinner on the 70th anniversary of his appearance at the 1946 dinner. Robinson met President Barack Obama and was saluted during the dinner, receiving a standing ovation as the picture of him as a child appeared on the video screens. In 2016, Robinson was inducted into the Rhythm & Blues Music Hall of Fame.

Robinson's 1955 song "Go Boy Go" was featured in a GMC advertisement in 2020.

Personal
In 2013, Robinson lost his belongings in a house fire which led him into financial debt. The Music Maker Relief Foundation organization received a call from friends and sent him a bed and put him on a monthly sustenance program. Buddy Smith, who was inspired by Robinson in the 1940s, sent him a piano.

References

Further reading

External links

Illustrated Sugar Chile Robinson discography

1938 births
Living people
20th-century American male musicians
20th-century American pianists
21st-century American male musicians
21st-century American pianists
African-American pianists
American child musicians
American jazz pianists
American male jazz musicians
American male pianists
Capitol Records artists
Detroit Institute of Technology alumni
Jazz musicians from Michigan
Musicians from Detroit
Olivet College alumni
20th-century African-American musicians
21st-century African-American musicians